Château Rauzan, Château Rausan or Château Rozan, is the name of an estate once the property of Pierre de Rauzan in Margaux and Pauillac, in the Bordeaux region of France, that became partitioned beginning at the end of the 18th century. The modern wine estates are:

In Margaux:
 Château Rauzan-Gassies
 Château Rauzan-Ségla
 Château Desmirail
 Château Marquis de Terme

In Pauillac:
 Château Pichon Longueville Baron
 Château Pichon Longueville Comtesse de Lalande